The Cactus Al/Bum (also known as The Cactus Cee/D and The Cactus Cas/Ette depending on release format) is the debut album by hip hop trio 3rd Bass, released on Def Jam Recordings on November 10, 1989. The album received positive reviews from the hip hop press and is also notable for featuring the recording debut of rapper Zev Love X of KMD, later known as MF Doom, on "The Gas Face". It was certified gold by the RIAA on April 24, 1990.

The Cactus Album peaked at #5 on Billboards Top Hip Hop/R&B Albums chart and at #55 on the Billboard 200 chart. In 1998, the album was selected as one of The Source's 100 Best Rap Albums. A decade later, Rhapsody included The Cactus Album in its list of "The 10 Best Albums By White Rappers".

Background 

Most of the music was produced by Sam Sever, alongside members MC Serch and Pete Nice, except for the Prince Paul-produced tracks "The Gas Face" and "Brooklyn-Queens," and "Steppin' to the A.M." and "Oval Office" by The Bomb Squad.
The album generally features songs that are either lyrical showcases or are about women, such as the hidden sexual meaning of "Oval Office". The song "Sons of 3rd Bass" can be viewed as a diss to the Beastie Boys – who had recently severed ties with 3rd Bass' record label, Def Jam – in that it references them in many lines, such as one line uttered by MC Serch in the first verse.

The song "Wordz of Wisdom" was recorded under the name Three the Hard Way. The group's name was changed after they signed to Def Jam; however, the recording still made its way onto the album.

The group had a minor hit with the single "The Gas Face". The accompanying music video, which featured a bevy of humorous cameo appearances that included Gilbert Gottfried, Flavor Flav, Salt-n-Pepa, and Erick Sermon, garnered MTV airplay. The song also features Daniel Dumile in his recording debut. At the time, he was recording under the alias Zev Love X and was a member of the rap trio KMD, but he would later come to be known as MF Doom. KMD were mentioned several times on the album, and they appeared in the music videos for "The Gas Face" and "Steppin' to the A.M."

Track listing 

2000 CD Release Bonus Track

 Singles 
"Steppin' to the A.M."
"The Gas Face"
"Brooklyn-Queens"
"Product of the Environment"

 Charting singles 

 The Cactus Vidie/Yo The Cactus Vidie/Yo''' is a collection of 3rd Bass music videos, released in 1991. The video, which was distributed by Columbia Music Video, contained music videos of the album's singles as well as short skits featuring Gilbert Gottfried that appeared between the selections. The "Wordz of Wisdom" and "Triple Stage Darkness" videos were not full-length and only contained the first couple verses of the song. The video was only released on VHS.

The videos featured are as follows:

 Steppin' to the A.M.
 Wordz of Wizdom (Just a Liddle Somethin)
 The Gas Face
 Triple Stage Darkness (Give Em A Taste)
 Brooklyn-Queens

Personnel 

3rd Bass
Pete Nice – Producer, Performer
MC Serch – Producer, Performer
DJ White Knight – Performer (Uncredited)
DJ Richie Rich – Performer (Live only)

Guest performer
Zev Love X – Performer on "The Gas Face"

Production
Prince Paul	- Producer
The Bomb Squad (Eric "Vietnam" Sadler, Hank Shocklee, Keith Shocklee) – Producer
Sam "Sever" Citrin – Producer

Technical Staff/Artwork
Steven Ett – Editing
Adam Gazzola – Editing
Kevin Reynolds – Engineer
Nick Sansano – Engineer
Chuck Valle – Engineer
Bruce Buchalter – Engineer
Curt Frasca – Mixing, Engineer
Greg Gordon – Engineer
Mark Mendelbaum – Engineer
Howard Zucker – Art Direction, Design
Cey Adams – Design, Logo Design

References 

1989 debut albums
3rd Bass albums
Def Jam Recordings albums
Albums produced by Prince Paul (producer)
Albums recorded at Chung King Studios